Arthur Hewlett (12 March 1907 in Southampton, Hampshire – 25 February 1997 in London) was a British actor.

Hewlett made his stage debut in 1930 at Plymouth Rep, and his theatre work included the original British production of Bernard Shaw's Buoyant Billions at the Malvern Festival in 1949. In 1954 he appeared in the West End in William Douglas Home's political comedy The Manor of Northstead.

He is perhaps best remembered for his roles on television, including Quatermass and the Pit, Police Surgeon, The Avengers, The Saint, No Hiding Place, The Baron, The Troubleshooters, Follyfoot, The Changes, Blake's 7, Doctor Who (in the serials State of Decay and Terror of the Vervoids), Shoestring, Juliet Bravo, The Black Adder and Moondial. Arthur Hewlett also played Dr Grant in Emmerdale Farm in 1973, and the part of Mr Medwin in an episode of Doctor At Large entitled "Where There's A Will".

Filmography

References

External links
 

1907 births
1997 deaths
British male television actors
Male actors from Southampton
20th-century British male actors